The 1964–65 Iowa State Cyclones men's basketball team represented Iowa State University during the 1964–65 NCAA Division I men's basketball season. The Cyclones were coached by Glen Anderson, who was in his sixth season with the Cyclones. They played their home games at the Iowa State Armory in Ames, Iowa.

They finished the season 9–16, 6–8 in Big Eight play to finish in fifth place.

Roster

Schedule and results 

|-
!colspan=6 style=""|Regular Season

|-

References 

Iowa State Cyclones men's basketball seasons
Iowa State
Iowa State Cyc
Iowa State Cyc